Gildon is a surname. Notable people with the surname include:

Charles Gildon ( 1665–1724), English author
Chris Gildon (born 1971 or 1972), American real estate broker and politician
Henry Gildon (before 1533 to after 1592), English politician
Jason Gildon (born 1972), American football player